Ononis sieberi is a plant species in the family Fabaceae.

Sources

References 

sieberi
Flora of Malta